Siayan may refer to places in the Philippines:
 Siayan Island
 Siayan, Zamboanga del Norte